Bongcheon  or Bongcheon-dong is a statutory division of Gwanak District, Seoul, South Korea. Its name means "enshrining heaven" which was derived from its location, northern skirt of Mt. Gwanak, stretching to the mountain ridge. It consists 9 administrative neighbourhoods. District office of Gwanak is located in Bongcheon.

Administrative divisions
As of September, 2008, there are 9 administrative neighbourhoods (dong) in Bongcheon.
"Bongsari" = Bongcheon Sageori

See also 
Administrative divisions of South Korea

References

External links
Official website
Map of the area at the official website

Neighbourhoods of Gwanak-gu